Dan Hicks (July 19, 1951 – June 30, 2020) was an American actor best known for starring roles in Evil Dead II, Darkman, and Intruder,.

Early years
Hicks was born in Pontiac, Michigan.

Career 

He was best known for starring roles in Evil Dead II, Darkman and Intruder, and had a number of supporting roles in director Sam Raimi's films.

Personal life and death
Hicks announced on June 5, 2020, he was diagnosed with stage 4 cancer, and was given between one and three years to live. He died on June 30 in his California home at age 68.

Partial filmography

References

External links
 
 
 

1951 births
2020 deaths
20th-century American male actors
21st-century American male actors
People from Pontiac, Michigan
American male film actors
Male actors from Michigan
American male voice actors
American male television actors
Deaths from cancer in California